John McArthur Lindsay (11 December 1921 – 9 February 2006) was a Scottish footballer who played in The Football League for Sheffield Wednesday, Bury, Carlisle United and Southport.

In 1952, he joined Wigan Athletic. In two spells at the club he made a combined total of 104 Lancashire Combination appearances, scoring 21 goals.

References

External links
 

1921 births
2006 deaths
Scottish footballers
Association football forwards
Greenock Morton F.C. players
Sheffield Wednesday F.C. players
English Football League players
Bury F.C. players
Carlisle United F.C. players
Southport F.C. players
Wigan Athletic F.C. players
Sportspeople from Cambuslang
Footballers from South Lanarkshire